"Crying in the Rain" is a song recorded by German Eurodance band Culture Beat, released in February 1996 as the second single from their third studio album, Inside Out (1995).. The single charted in many countries, reaching its best chart positions in Hungary, Germany and Denmark, where it was a top 10 hit. It also reached number-one on the Canadian RPM Dance/Urban chart. A CD maxi-single containing remixes of "Crying in the Rain" was also released under the name "Crying in the Rain Remixes".

Critical reception
Larry Flick from Billboard noted that "Tania Evans smolders on the Culture Beat kicker "Crying In The Rain"—which is by far the act's most viable bid for pop radio success since 1994's "Mr. Vain"." Damien Mendis from Music Weeks RM Dance Update rated the song four out of five, remarking its "traditional speedy Euro style with galloping bass, sweeping synths and obligatory energetic rap capturing its catchiness." He concluded, "You'll either love it or hate it." Another editor, James Hamilton described it as "Tania Evans wailed and gruff J. Supreme muttered Eurodisco".

Chart performance
"Crying in the Rain" was quite successful on the charts in both Canada and Europe, peaking at number-one on the Canadian RPM Dance/Urban chart. In Europe, it made the top 10 in Denmark, Germany and Hungary, where it peaked at number ten, eight and three. The single was also a top 20 hit in Austria, Belgium, Finland and Switzerland, and a top 30 hit in Scotland, Sweden and the United Kingdom, as well as on the Eurochart Hot 100, where it hit number 28. In the UK, "Crying in the Rain" peaked at number 29 in its first week at the UK Singles Chart, on June 9, 1996.
 
Music video
A music video was produced to promote the single, directed by Oliver Sommer. It was filmed in Hong Kong, China.

Track listings

 CD single (Germany, 1996) "Crying in the Rain" (Radio Edit) - 3:54
 "Crying in the Rain" (Not Normal Mix - Special Acoustic Version) - 3:30

 CD maxi-single (Europe, 1996) "Crying in the Rain" (Radio Edit) - 3:54
 "Crying in the Rain" (Extended Mix) - 5:38
 "Crying in the Rain" (Doug Laurent Mix) - 6:09
 "Crying in the Rain" (Brainformed Mix) - 6:54
 "Crying in the Rain" (Let The Love House 7" Mix) - 3:52
 "Crying in the Rain" (Sweetbox Funky 7" Mix) - 3:22
 "Crying in the Rain" (Not Normal Mix) - 3:30
 "Out of Touch" - 4:08

 CD maxi-single - Remix (Germany, 1996) "Crying in the Rain" (Aboria Euro Radio Mix) - 3:49
 "Crying in the Rain" (Temple Of Light Mix) - 6:31
 "Crying in the Rain" (Celvin Rotane Mix) - 6:58
 "Crying in the Rain" (Stonebridge & Nick Nice Club Mix) - 8:10
 "Crying in the Rain" (Großer Club Mix) - 7:58
 "Crying in the Rain" (Jim Clarke Mix) - 5:36
 "Crying in the Rain" (Aboria Euro 12" Mix) - 6:43

 CD single (France, 1996) "Crying in the Rain" (Aboria Euro Radio) - 3:49
 "Crying in the Rain" (Aboria Euro Mix) - 6:43

 CD maxi-single 1 (UK, 1996) "Crying in the Rain" (Radio Edit) - 3:54
 "Mr. Vain" (Mr House) - 6:18
 "Got to Get It" (Hypnotic Mix) - 7:17
 "Anything" (Trancemix) - 6:30

 CD maxi-single 2 (UK, 1996) "Crying in the Rain" (Radio Edit) - 3:54
 "Crying in the Rain" (Extended Mix) - 5:38
 "Crying in the Rain" (Sweetbox Funky 12" Mix) - 7:13
 "Crying in the Rain" (Brainformed Mix) - 6:54
 "Crying in the Rain" (Let The Love House 12" Mix) - 7:01
 "Crying in the Rain" (Not Normal Mix) - 3:30

 12" maxi vinyl single (France, 1996) "Crying in the Rain" (Aboria Euro Mix) - 6:43
 "Crying in the Rain" (Extended Mix) - 5:38
 "Crying in the Rain" (Radio Edit) - 3:54

 12" maxi vinyl single - Remix (France, 1996)'
 "Crying in the Rain" (Brainformed Mix) - 6:54
 "Crying in the Rain" (Sweetbox Funky 7" Mix) - 3:22
 "Crying in the Rain" (Let The Love House 7" Mix) - 3:52

Charts

Weekly charts

Year-end charts

References

1996 singles
1996 songs
Culture Beat songs
Dance Pool singles
English-language German songs
Music videos directed by Oliver Sommer
Songs written by Jay Supreme